Triviño is a surname. Notable people with the surname include:

Juan Triviño (born 1980), Ecuadorian footballer
Lou Trivino (born 1991), American baseball player
Ricardo Triviño (born 1973), Mexican rally driver
Tulio Triviño, fictional character in Chilean comedy TV series 31 Minutos
Juancho Triviño (born 1993),Filipino actor